Skipper or skippers may refer to:

Rank 
 Skipper (boating), a person who has command of a vessel
 Skipper (rank), a former warrant rank in the British Royal Naval Reserve.  Also informal for an officer of sergeant rank in British policing
 The leader of a Sea Scouts (Boy Scouts of America) troop

Sports 
 Another name for a team's manager (baseball), captain (association football), or captain (cricket)
 One who skips using a skipping rope
 Houston Skippers, a minor league ice hockey team based in Houston, Texas, that played in the 1946 season
 Skipper (cannon), the game cannon used by the Virginia Tech Hokies football team

People 
 Skipper (surname)
 Rudolf Scheepers "Skipper" Badenhorst (born 1978), South African rugby union player
 Hargrove "Skipper" Bowles (1919–1986), American politician and businessman
 Klemen Andersen "Skipper Clement" (c. 1484–1536), Danish merchant, captain, privateer and leader of a peasant rebellion
 Francis "Skipper" Gidney (1890–1928), an early leader of the Scouting movement in the United Kingdom
 Thomas Pinckney "Skipper" Heard (1898–1980), longtime athletics director of Louisiana State University
 Lewis "Skipper" Mullins (born c. 1945), American Taekwondo 10th degree black belt
 Clarence "Skipper" Roberts (1888–1963), American Major League Baseball catcher
 Skipper Wise, American singer, songwriter, musician and entrepreneur

Places 
 Skippers, Virginia, an unincorporated community
 Skippers Canyon, New Zealand

Arts and entertainment 
 The Skipper, a character from the television series Gilligan's Island
 Skipper (Barbie), a doll, Barbie's younger sister
 Skipper (Madagascar), a character in Madagascar and The Penguins of Madagascar
 Kill Cruise (German title: Der Skipper), a 1990 film starring Jürgen Prochnow, Patsy Kensit and Elizabeth Hurley
 Skippers (TV programme), an Irish documentary series
 Skipper Riley, a character in the movie Planes

Animals 
 Skipper (butterfly), a family of butterflies
 Another name for the European sprat, a fish
 The larvae of Piophila casei are sometimes called "cheese skippers" or "ham skippers"

Aviation 
 Beechcraft Skipper, a model of aircraft
 Skippers Aviation, a charter airline based in Osborne Park, a suburb of Perth, Australia

Other uses 
 AGM-123 Skipper II, a short-range laser-guided missile
 AMT Skipper, a semi-automatic pistol
 USS Skipper (AMc-104), a U.S. Navy minesweeper
 Skippers Seafood & Chowder House, a chain of independently owned and operated restaurants
 Skipper (computer software), a visualization tool and code generator for PHP ORM frameworks

See also 
Skip (disambiguation)